J9 (an abbreviation of Jolin's Night) is a compilation album by Taiwanese singer Jolin Tsai. It was released on November 12, 2004, by Sony. It contains two new songs and nine remixes of songs previously released by Sony.

Background and development 
On February 27, 2004, Tsai released her sixth studio album, Castle. On July 8, 2004, she announced that she would embark on her first concert tour J1 World Tour at Hongkou Football Stadium in Shanghai, China on August 7, 2004. On October 6, 2004, she announced that he would hold the J1 World Tour at Chungshan Football Stadium in Taipei, Taiwan on November 20, 2004. On October 27, 2004, it was revealed that she would release a compilation album named J9 on November 12, 2004.

Title and artwork 
The title of the album "J9" is the abbreviation of "Jolin's Night". Using "9" instead of "night" is a popular way of writing in Western dance music and black music. It also reflects that the songs from the album are very suitable for night party. Tsai wore a vintage white lace dress and fur shawl dressed by Taiwanese stylist Roger Cheng on the album cover.

Release and promotion 
The album includes two new songs—"Signature Gesture" and "Singleness"—and nine remixes of songs previously released by Sony. The lyrics of "Signature Gesture" describe the attitude and personality of girls who need to be confident and live out themselves, while the nine remixes incorporate elements such as lounge, techno, and chill-out. The music video of "Signature Gesture" was co-directed by Marlboro Lai and Bill Chia, and the music video of "Singleness" was directed by Jimmy Chou. The album peaked at number two, number three, and number six on the weekly album sales charts of G-Music, Asia Records, and Five Music, respectively. "Signature Gesture" reached number 61 on the Hit FM Top 100 Singles of the Year chart of 2004.

Live performances 
On December 17, 2004, Tsai participated in the 2004 TVB8 Mandarin Music On Demand Awards and sang "Signature Gesture". On December 26, 2004, she participated in the 2004 Metro Radio Hits Music Awards and sang "Signature Gesture". On January 11, 2005, she participated in the 11th China Music Awards and sang "Signature Gesture".

On January 15, 2005, Tsai participated in the CCTV television show The Same Song and sang "Signature Gesture". On January 16, 2005, she participated in the 2005 Hito Music Awards and sang "Signature Gesture". On January 11, 2006, she participated in the 12th China Music Awards and sang "Signature Gesture". Since then, Tsai has been performing songs from the album at various events.

Critical reception 
Tencent Entertainment's Shuwa commented: "This is a greatest hits album of dance music that has been promoted, mainly including the remixes of the dance songs from Magic and Castle, and it was used as a warm-up of Jolin Tsai's upcoming first world tour. The album itself is not very impressive, except for two new songs, other songs included are just remixes of the dance hits at that time. But, Jolin Tsai's popularity has long been on the rise, and with the campaign of 'limited release', the album is still being snapped up by her fans."

Accolades 
On September 9, 2005, "Signature Gesture" won a Global Chinese Music Award for Top 25 Songs.

Track listing

Release history

References

External links 
 
 

2004 compilation albums
Jolin Tsai compilation albums
Sony Music Taiwan compilation albums